Atanas Iliev (born November 12, 1944) is a former Bulgarian ice hockey goaltender. He played for the Bulgaria men's national ice hockey team at the 1976 Winter Olympics in Innsbruck.

References

1944 births
Living people
Bulgarian ice hockey goaltenders
Ice hockey players at the 1976 Winter Olympics
Olympic ice hockey players of Bulgaria